Walter Ernest How (25 December 1885 – 5 August 1972) was an English sailor, known for taking part in the Ernest Shackleton-led Imperial Trans-Antarctic Expedition from 1914 to 1917.

Born in Bermondsey, London, he became a sailor when he was 12 years old.

When the Endurance made a stop at Buenos Aires en route to the Antarctica, How, along with William Bakewell, helped smuggle Perce Blackborow on board as a stowaway. After the Endurance sank, trapped in the sea ice around Antarctica, How was forced to survive upon the icebergs along with the rest of the crew.  When they later used the three wooden lifeboats to row to Elephant Island, How was in the Stancomb Wills.

On return to England after their eventual rescue, How was awarded the Polar Medal and joined the Merchant Navy during the Great War.

Footnotes

External links 
 

1885 births
1972 deaths
English explorers
Sailors from London
Imperial Trans-Antarctic Expedition
People from Bermondsey
Recipients of the Polar Medal